The Moreton Bay Indoor Sports Centre is a proposed, sports venue to be built for boxing events at the 2032 Summer Olympics. 

It is expected to have a seating capacity of 7,000.

See also

List of sports venues in Australia
Venues of the 2032 Summer Olympics and Paralympics

References

Venues of the 2032 Summer Olympics and Paralympics
Buildings and structures in Moreton Bay Region
Proposed indoor arenas
Proposed sports venues in Australia
Olympic boxing venues
Boxing venues in Australia